John Nicolson (born 1961) is a Scottish journalist and politician who served as a Member of Parliament from 2015 to 2017, and again from 2019 to date.

John Nicolson may also refer to:

 John Nicolson (artist) (1891–1951), British artist
 John Nicolson (Australian cricketer) (1917–1992), Australian cricketer
 John Nicolson (South African cricketer) (1899–1935), South African cricketer
 John B. Nicolson (1783–1846), American naval officer

See also
 John Nicholson (disambiguation)